Nitrite oxidoreductase (NOR or NXR) is an enzyme involved in nitrification. It is the last step in the process of aerobic ammonia oxidation, which is carried out by two groups of nitrifying bacteria: ammonia oxidizers such as Nitrosospira, Nitrosomonas and Nitrosococcus convert ammonia to nitrite, while nitrite oxidizers such as Nitrobacter and Nitrospira oxidize nitrite to nitrate.

The enzyme is bound to the inner cytoplasmic surface of the bacterial membrane and contains multiple subunits, iron-sulfur centers and a molybdenum cofactor. The enzyme is relatively abundant, making up 10-30% of the total protein in these bacteria and forms densely packed structures on the membrane surface.

Reaction
{nitrite} + acceptor <=> {nitrate} + reduced\ acceptor

See also
Microbial metabolism
Ferredoxin—nitrite reductase involved in the assimilation of nitrates by plants

References

External links
MetaCyc Pathway: nitrite oxidation

Oxidoreductases